Alcidamas, of Elaea, in Aeolis, was a Greek sophist and rhetorician, who flourished in the 4th century BC.

Life
He was the pupil and successor of Gorgias and taught at Athens at the same time as Isocrates, to whom he was a rival and opponent. We possess two declamations under his name: On Sophists (Περὶ Σοφιστῶν), directed against Isocrates and setting forth the superiority of extempore over written speeches (a more recently discovered fragment of another speech against Isocrates  is probably of later date); Odysseus (perhaps spurious) in which Odysseus accuses Palamedes of treachery during the siege of Troy.

According to Alcidamas, the highest aim of the orator was the power of speaking ex tempore on every conceivable subject. Aristotle (Rhet. iii. 3) criticizes his writings as characterized by pomposity of style and an extravagant use of poetical epithets and compounds and far-fetched metaphors.

Of other works only fragments and the titles have survived: Messeniakos, advocating the freedom of the Messenians and containing the sentiment that "God has left all men free; nature has made no man a slave"; a Eulogy of Death, in consideration of the wide extent of human sufferings; a Techne or instruction-book in the art
of rhetoric; and a Phusikos logos. Lastly, his Mouseion (a word invoking the Muses) seems to have contained the narrative of the Contest of Homer and Hesiod,  of which the version that has survived  is the work of a grammarian in the time of Hadrian, based on Alcidamas.  This hypothesis of the contents of the Mouseion, originally suggested by Nietzsche (Rheinisches Museum 25 (1870) & 28 (1873)), appears to have been confirmed by three papyrus findsone 3rd century BC (Flinders Petrie Papyri, ed.  Mahaffy, 1891, pl. xxv.), one 2nd century BC (Basil Mandilaras, 'A new papyrus fragment of the Certamen Homeri et Hesiodi''' Platon 42 (1990) 45–51)  and one 2nd or 3rd century AD (University of Michigan pap. 2754: Winter, J. G., 'A New Fragment on the Life of Homer' TAPA 56 (1925) 120–129 ).

Notes

References

O'Sullivan, N. (2008) 'The authenticity of [Alcidamas] Odysseus: two new linguistic arguments', Classical Quarterly 58, 638-647

Further reading
Alcidamas' surviving works
Guido Avezzù (ed.), Alcidamante. Orazioni e frammenti (now the standard text, with Italian translation, 1982)
J.V. Muir (ed.), Alcidamas. The works and fragments (text with English translation, 2001) – reviewed in BMCR
Ruth Mariss, Alkidamas: Über diejenigen, die schriftliche Reden schreiben, oder über die Sophisten: eine Sophistenrede aus dem 4. Jh. v. Chr., eingeleitet und kommentiert (Orbis Antiquus, 36), 2002
Friedrich Blass, Teubner edition of the Greek text (1908) online
Alcidamas, "Against the Sophists," trans. Van Hook (1919)
About Alcidamas
Aristotle, Rhetoric III.3
J. Vahlen, "Der Rhetor Alkidamas", Sitzungsberichte der wiener Akademie, Phil.-Hist. Cl., 43 (1863) 491–528 online(=Gesammelte philologische Schriften (Leipzig & Berlin 1911) 1.117–155)
Friedrich Blass, Die attische Beredsamkeit'', part 2 (1892) online, pp. 345–363
M.L. West (1967) for Alcidamas' invention of the contest of Homer and Hesiod , N.J. Richardson (1981) against 
Various articles on Alcidamas (1856–1919, with links to further online material)
Additional bibliography is available online at 

Sophists
Ancient Greek rhetoricians
4th-century BC Greek people